Jaclyn Corin (born October 27, 2000) is an American activist against gun violence. 
She survived the Stoneman Douglas High School shooting in 2018. She is one of the co-founders of March for Our Lives and the organizer of a student protest to Tallahassee, Florida. She has also been a vocal critic of politicians funded by the National Rifle Association.

Corin was included in Time magazine's 100 Most Influential People of 2018.

Education and shooting 
As a student attending the Marjory Stoneman Douglas High School, Jaclyn Corin was the junior class president at the time of the deadly shooting in 2018. Her close friends Joaquin Oliver and Jaime Guttenberg were killed in the shooting; she had once tutored the 19-year-old alleged gunman and former student of the school, Nikolas Cruz. During the shooting, Corin was locked in a room with other classmates for several hours, emerging with hands up as instructed by the police SWAT units.

Advocacy  
Corin met with fellow students at Stoneman Douglas, including David Hogg, X González, Cameron Kasky, and Alex Wind at Kasky's house; they formed the Never Again MSD movement during these meetings. At first it was a small core group of students, but subsequent meetings came to about twenty students. She explained that their media strategy was to knock through the gun-safety defeatism, reframe the debate, and keep making noise with powerful demonstrations. They acted quickly to take advantage of the news coverage.

Corin was a key organizer of the bus trip protest to the Florida state capital on February 20, six days after the shooting. A report in Vanity Fair suggested it was her idea to have the bus trip soon after the shooting because it was alive in the news cycle; she said "the news forgets -- very quickly -- we needed a critical mass event." Working with fellow students-turned-activists Cameron Kasky and David Hogg, she recruited several hundred MSD students to make an eight-hour bus trip to Tallahassee as part of a "lightning strike". She helped engineer the behind-the-scenes logistics including transportation, chaperone and sleeping arrangements, scheduling meetings with Florida lawmakers and getting permission slips from parents. She demanded the group wear normal school attire and not quibble about bus seating; when some asked for changes to sit with friends, she said "No -- get on your bus." The trip was organized largely by social media and texting.

Corin was a key planner of the March for Our Lives nationwide student protest that occurred on March 24. She advocates that adults register to vote and vote, and that children pre-register. She discussed media coverage:

Corin has made YouTube videos; one called "WhatIf" got 1.4 million views in  three days. She has appeared on national television.   In anticipation of the March for Our Lives, she appeared on the March 21 episode of the Rachel Maddow Show, along with Gonzalez and Sarah Chadwick.  She spoke at a rally in Chapel Hill, North Carolina on March 29. She, Gonzalez, Hogg, Kasky and Alex Wind are pictured on the third week of March's Time cover.

Corin criticized the NRA and gun manufacturers for touting the Ideal Conceal, a handgun that folds up to resemble a smart phone. She faulted the NRA for "enforcing the normality of shooting other people"; further, she argued that police, confronting people including persons of color with smart phones, might believe that their phones were weapons, and shoot them on accident.

Works

References

External links
 
 

2000 births
Living people
American gun control activists
American shooting survivors
People from Parkland, Florida
Stoneman Douglas High School shooting activists
21st-century American women
Gun politics in the United States
American child activists